Aziz Daneshrad (1920–1991) also known as Gabay and Kiyai was an Iranian Jewish political activist who represented Jews in the Assembly for the Final Review of the Constitution. His was a proponent of left-wing politics while also advocating ethnoreligious identity.

Early life and education 
Aziz Daneshrad-Kiyai was born in 1920 in Golpayegan, Isfahan Province. His father was a rabbi and a merchant in bazaar. He obtained a bachelor's degree in electrical engineering from the University of Tehran and then became a civil servant.

Political career 
During the rule of Pahlavi dynasty, Daneshrad was a dissident associated with the Tudeh Party of Iran and he was imprisoned in the 1960s and the 1970s.

He co-founded the Association of Jewish Iranian Intellectuals (Jame‘eh-ye rowshanfekran-e kalimi-ye Iran; abbreviated AJII) in 1978, a revolutionary organization that tried to challenge the old guard leadership of the Jewish community which had royalist and Zionist orientations.

After the Iranian Revolution, he took charge as the interim chairman of the Tehran Jewish Association because the previous officeholder Habib Elghanian was executed. Daneshrad was elected to the Assembly for the Final Review of the Constitution shortly after. There he was one of the four members who represented religious minorities and he is likely to have sided with opposition to inclusion of the Guardianship of the Islamic Jurists in the constitution.

Personal life 
Daneshrad married his paternal cousin, Aghdas, in 1944. The couple had three sons and two daughters.

Accolades

National 
  Prime Medal of His Royal Highness
  Order of the Crown (Second Class)

References 

1920 births
1991 deaths
People from Golpayegan
Iranian Jews
Tudeh Party of Iran members
Jewish socialists
Jewish engineers
Jewish Iranian politicians
Iranian electrical engineers
University of Tehran alumni
Members of the Assembly of Experts for Constitution
20th-century Jews
20th-century Iranian people